Ross Laidlaw is a Scottish writer of historical, thriller and spy fiction.

Biography
Laidlaw was born in Aberdeen and now lives in East Lothian. He attended the University of Cambridge and has spent time working and traveling in southern Africa. In 1979, while working as a geography and history teacher at Belhaven Hill School near Dunbar, Laidlaw's first book was released, The Lion is Rampant, receiving significant praise. He has since released five more books with the most recent being Justinian: The Sleepless One which was released in 2010.

Bibliography
The Lion is Rampant (1979) – originally published by Molendinar Press, it is a political thriller set in Scotland during the 1980s.
The Linton Porcupine (1984) – originally published by Littlehampton Book Services, set in 16th century Scotland it is written as the journal of Nicholas Wainwright who has been sent to find a weapon that is being created by the Scots.
Aphra Behn: Dispatch'd from Athole (1992) – originally published by Balnain Books, set in 17th century Britain, the story tells of Aphra Behn's journal which details her mission to Scotland as a spy.
Attila: The Scourge of God (2004) – originally published by Polygon Books, set in fifth century Europe, the story centers around Attila the Hun and Aetius who are in battle with each other for the fate of their empires.
Theoderic (2008) – originally published by Polygon Books, set in fifth century Europe during a time when the Western Roman Empire has been left in ruins, the story centers around Theodoric the Goth who rises to a status equal of Roman Emperors.
Justinian (2010) – originally published by Polygon Books, it follows the life of Justinian I, an emperor of the Byzantine Empire.

References

External links
Ross Laidlaw at Birlinn Limited

Living people
Scottish historical novelists
Scottish thriller writers
Year of birth missing (living people)
Alumni of the University of Cambridge